Berg is a village in the Dutch province of Limburg. It is a part of the municipality of Valkenburg aan de Geul, and lies about 7 km east of Maastricht.

The village was first mentioned in 1139 as Berga, and means hill.

The St Monulphus and Gondulphus Church is a three-aisled church made out of chalk stone. It was built between 1931 and 1933.

Berg was home to 314 people in 1840. Until 1982, Berg and the neighbouring hamlet of Terblijt constituted the municipality of Berg en Terblijt, which also covered the small hamlets of Geulhem and Vilt.

Gallery

References

Populated places in Limburg (Netherlands)
Valkenburg aan de Geul

fr:Berg#Toponymes